Alia Sylla (born 4 September 1988) is a Guinean footballer who is last known to have played as a midfielder or striker for Monastir.

Early life
Sylla was born in Conakry, Guinea before moving to Marseille in France and then returning to Guinea to play for second tier side FC Sumbay.

Club career
After going on trial with Lokomotiv, Sylla signed for Chayka Yubileyny in the Russian fourth division.

Before the 2013 season, he signed for Energetik Dushanbe.

During the 2014 season, Sylla played for CSKA Pamir Dushanbe, scoring 6 goals.

Aly Osh 
Prior to the 2015 season, Sylla signed for Kyrgyzstani club Alay Osh from Tajik club CSKA Pamir, winning the Kyrgyz Premier League for the first time as well as finishing the season as the leagues top goal scorer, with 17 goals. The following season, Sylla again won the Kyrgyz Premier League, finished the season as the leagues top goal scorer with 21 goals, and won the June player of the month. At the end of the 2017 season, Sylla won the Kyrgyz Premier League and finished as the leagues top goal scorer, for a third year in a row, scoring 12 goals. Sylla left Alay Osh in July 2018 having scored 5 goals in 5 games during the 2018 season, after his contract expired. 

In May 2018, Sylla was handed a 10 match ban by the Kyrgyz Football Union after being involved in a mass brawl on 20 May 2018 at the end of the match between Aly and Alga Bishkek.

Sylla left Alay in July 2018 after his contract with the club expired.

Monastir
After leaving Alay Sylla signed a two-year contract with Tunisian club Monastir in October 2018.

Honours 
Regar-TadAZ Tursunzoda
 Tajikistan Cup: 2012

Alay Osh
 Kyrgyz Premier League: 2015, 2016, 2017

Individual
 Kyrgyz Premier League top-goalscorer: 2015, 2016, 2017

References

External links
 
 
 

Living people
Guinean footballers
1988 births
Association football midfielders
Association football forwards
Tunisian Ligue Professionnelle 1 players
US Monastir (football) players
FC Alay players
CSKA Pamir Dushanbe players
Tajikistan Higher League players
Kyrgyz Premier League players
Guinean expatriate footballers
Sportspeople from Conakry
Guinean expatriate sportspeople in Russia
Guinean expatriate sportspeople in Tajikistan
Guinean expatriate sportspeople in Kyrgyzstan
Expatriate footballers in Russia
Expatriate footballers in Kyrgyzstan
Expatriate footballers in Tajikistan
Expatriate footballers in Tunisia